Eocnides fragilis is a species of beetle in the family Carabidae, the only species in the genus Eocnides.

References

Trechinae